The 2022 Conference USA men's basketball tournament was the concluding event of the 2021–22 men's basketball season for Conference USA (C-USA). It was held March 8–12, 2022, in Frisco, Texas, at the Ford Center at The Star. The winner, the UAB Blazers, received the conference's automatic bid to the 2022 NCAA tournament.

Seeds

Schedule

Bracket 

* denotes overtime period.

See also
 2022 Conference USA women's basketball tournament

References 

Tournament
Conference USA men's basketball tournament
College sports tournaments in Texas
Sports in Frisco, Texas
Conference USA men's basketball tournament
Conference USA men's basketball tournament
Basketball competitions in Texas